Strayz (commonly stylised as STRAYZ) is a self-financed Hong Kong Cantopop girl group formed through ViuTV's reality talent show King Maker IV in 2021. The group consists of five members: CK Wong, Valentina Cho, Wyllis Lam, Natalie Ho and Ariel Tsang. They debuted in April 2022, with their debut "Stray" released in July the same year.

Members

Discography

Singles

Filmography

Television shows

Videography

Music videos

Awards and nominations

References

External links

Hong Kong girl groups
Cantopop musical groups
Musical groups established in 2022
2022 establishments in Hong Kong
Musical quintets
Hong Kong idols
Vocal quintets
King Maker IV contestants